Queer Bar (stylized as Queer/Bar) is a bar catering to the queer community in Seattle's Capitol Hill neighborhood, in the United States. Queer Bar hosts drag shows regularly.

History
The business was established in 2017, replacing Purr Cocktail Lounge, another gay bar which relocated.

Robbie Turner has served as the venue's entertainment director.

The bar began serving Sunset Fried Chicken's sandwiches in late 2018.

Bosco and Irene Dubois, contestants on season 14 and season 15 of RuPaul's Drag Race, respectively, have performed at the bar.

References

External links

 
 

2017 establishments in Washington (state)
Capitol Hill, Seattle
LGBT drinking establishments in Washington (state)
LGBT nightclubs in Seattle
Queer culture